= Still Life with Guitar (Picasso) =

1919 painting by Pablo Picasso

- Artist: Pablo Picasso
- Year: 1919
- Medium: Gouache, graphite on paper
- Dimensions: 12.7 cm × 9.8 cm (5 in × 3.9 in)
- Location: Private collection

Still Life with Guitar is a 1919 painting by Pablo Picasso. It is worth an estimated €600,000.

== Disappearance and recovery ==
The painting went missing on October 6, 2025, while en route to an exhibit put on by CajaGranada Cultural Center in Granada, Spain. It was later recovered on October 24, 2025, in Madrid. Police concluded the painting had been mistakenly left behind by transporters.
